Jasmin may refer to:

Plants 
Gardenia jasminoides, also called gardenia
Jasminocereus, a genus of cacti
Jasminum officinale, the flowering plant commonly called jasmine
Solanum laxum, syn. Solanum jasminoides

People 
 Jasmin (given name), a given name derived from Jasmine, the flower
 Jasmin (singer) (born 1977), Russian pop singer, actress, model, and TV presenter
 Jasmin, French name for Jacques Jasmin (1798–1864), French poet
 Jasminka Domaš (born 1948), Croatian writer, journalist and scientist
Victoire Jasmin (born 1955), French politician

Other uses 
 Jasmin (Paris Métro), a train station on Line 9 of the Paris Metro
 Jasmin, Saskatchewan, a hamlet in Saskatchewan, Canada
 JASMIN, a super-data-cluster operated by the Centre for Environmental Data Analysis in the United Kingdom

See also
 Jasmine (disambiguation)
 Yasmin (disambiguation)